Reverend Samuel Black (March 3, 1813 – July 13, 1899) was a Methodist circuit riding preacher from Greenbrier County, West Virginia. Largely based in Greenbrier County, the Reverend also preached through the counties of Kanawha, Braxton, Webster, Nicholas, Fayette, Jackson, and Clay. One of 16 founding members of the West Virginia Methodist Conference, Reverend Black was ordained as a deacon in 1844 and continued to preach until near his death. The community of Sam Black Church, West Virginia along with its centerpiece, the Sam Black Methodist Church were named after the influential preacher shortly after his death.

References

1813 births
1899 deaths
People from Greenbrier County, West Virginia
Methodists from West Virginia
19th-century American Methodist ministers
Religious leaders from West Virginia